Martin D. Pugh  (born 1947) is a British historian and the author of more than a dozen books on 19th- and 20th-century British women's, political, and social history. He has held professorships at Newcastle University and Liverpool John Moores University, and is a fellow of the Royal Historical Society. He has written 19 articles for the Oxford Dictionary of National Biography.

Selected works

 Lloyd George (Profiles in Power) (1988)
 The Making of Modern British Politics: 1867–1945, 3rd edition (2002)
 We Danced All Night: A Social History of Britain Between the Wars (2008)
 The Pankhursts: The History of One Radical Family (2009)
 Speak for Britain! A New History of the Labour Party (2010)
 Hurrah for the Blackshirts! Fascists and Fascism in Britain Between the Wars (2013)
 State and Society: A Social and Political History of Britain Since 1870, 5th edition (2017)

References

External links
 Official website

1947 births
20th-century British historians
21st-century British historians
Academics of Liverpool John Moores University
Academics of Newcastle University
Alumni of the University of Bristol
Fellows of the Royal Historical Society
Living people